Montenegro competed at the 2011 World Aquatics Championships in Shanghai, China.

Water polo

Men

Team Roster 

Denis Sefik
Drasko Brguljan
Aleksandar Radović
Damjan Danilovic
Nikola Vukcevic
Milan Ticic
Filip Klikovac
Nikola Janovic - Captain
Aleksandar Ivovic
Darko Brguljan
Antonio Petrovic
Predrag Jokic
Milos Scepanovic

Group A

Playoff round

Quarterfinals

Classification 5–8

Seventh place game

References

Nations at the 2011 World Aquatics Championships
2011 in Montenegrin sport
Montenegro at the World Aquatics Championships